The International Ornithological Committee (IOC) recognizes 352 species in family Columbidae, the pigeons and doves. They are distributed among 50 genera. This list is presented according to the IOC taxonomic sequence and can also be sorted alphabetically by common name and binomial. It includes 13 extinct species. For a list of domesticated varieties, see List of pigeon breeds.

The IOC breeding range descriptions use the following abbreviations for continents and other major geographic areas.

AF: Africa
AU: Australasia (New Guinea, Australia, New Zealand, the Solomon Islands, and the Bismarck Archipelago)
EU: Eurasia (Europe and Asia to the Oriental Region boundary)
IO: Indian Ocean
MA: Middle America
NA: North America
OR: Oriental region (South Asia from Pakistan to Taiwan, southeast Asia, the Philippines, and Greater Sundas)
PO: Polynesia (including Caroline and Mariana Islands)
SA: South America

References

Columbidae
Lists of birds
Columbidae